Jamesia papulenta is a species of beetle in the family Cerambycidae. It was described by James Thomson in 1868. It is known from Ecuador, Costa Rica, Colombia, Panama, Nicaragua, and Peru.

References

Onciderini
Beetles described in 1868